The Kiyoura Cabinet is the 23rd Cabinet of Japan led by Kiyoura Keigo from January 7, 1924 to June 11, 1924.

Cabinet

References 

Cabinet of Japan
1924 establishments in Japan
Cabinets established in 1924
Cabinets disestablished in 1924